Ji Sun-mi (born 9 April 1991) is a South Korean footballer who plays as a midfielder and captains WK League club Sejong Sportstoto WFC. She has been a member of the South Korea women's national team.

References

1991 births
Living people
South Korean women's footballers
Women's association football midfielders
South Korea women's international footballers